Kim Soon-Hyung (born 15 July 1973) is a retired South Korean middle distance runner who specialized in the 800 and 1500 metres. He represented South Korea in the 800 m at the 2000 Summer Olympics.

He was the 1993 Asian Champion over 1500 m and is a two-time East Asian Games champion, having won in 1993 and 1997. He won two silver medals at the 1998 Asian Games.

Achievements

Personal bests
800 metres - 1:46.03 min (1994)
1500 metres - 3:38.60 min (1993)

References

1973 births
Living people
South Korean male middle-distance runners
Athletes (track and field) at the 2000 Summer Olympics
Olympic athletes of South Korea
Asian Games medalists in athletics (track and field)
Athletes (track and field) at the 1994 Asian Games
Athletes (track and field) at the 1998 Asian Games
Athletes (track and field) at the 2002 Asian Games
Asian Games gold medalists for South Korea
Asian Games silver medalists for South Korea
Medalists at the 1994 Asian Games
Medalists at the 1998 Asian Games
Competitors at the 1995 Summer Universiade
Competitors at the 1999 Summer Universiade